Ladstone Holdings Ltd v Leonora Holdings Ltd [2006] 1 NZLR 211 is a cited case in New Zealand regarding that silence on a matter does not constitute misrepresentation.

References

New Zealand contract case law
2004 in New Zealand law
High Court of New Zealand cases
2004 in case law